The Monastery of St. Scholastica is a monastery in Birgu, Malta. The monastery is dedicated to Santa Scholastica, but the church is dedicated to St Anne. It was built in 1679 by Lorenzo Gafà.

The monastery and church are listed on the National Inventory of the Cultural Property of the Maltese Islands.

See also

Culture of Malta
History of Malta
List of Churches in Malta
Religion in Malta

References

17th-century Roman Catholic church buildings in Malta
Roman Catholic chapels in Malta
Buildings and structures in Birgu
Religious buildings and structures completed in 1679
Roman Catholic churches completed in 1679
National Inventory of the Cultural Property of the Maltese Islands
1679 establishments in Malta